The University of Winnipeg (UWinnipeg, UW) is a public research university in Winnipeg, Manitoba, Canada, that offers undergraduate faculties of art, business and economics, education, science and kinesiology and applied health as well as graduate programs. UWinnipeg's founding colleges were Manitoba College and Wesley College, which merged to form United College in 1938. The University of Winnipeg was established in 1967 when United College received its charter. The governance was modelled on the provincial University of Toronto Act of 1906 which established a bicameral system of university government consisting of a senate (faculty), responsible for academic policy, and a board of governors (citizens) exercising exclusive control over financial policy and having formal authority in all other matters. The president, appointed by the board, was a link between the bodies to perform institutional leadership.

The university is a member of the Association of Universities and Colleges of Canada (AUCC), the Association of Commonwealth Universities (ACU), the Canadian University Society for Intercollegiate Debate (CUSID) and a member of U Sports.

History

 
The U of W's founding colleges were Manitoba College, 1871, and Wesley College, 1888, which merged to form United College in 1938. In 1967, United College received a charter and became the University of Winnipeg. George Creeford Browne (architect) & S. Frank Peters designed Wesley Hall (1894–5), which is now part of the University of Winnipeg.

The University of Winnipeg was established on 1 July 1967 when United College received its charter.
United College was formed in 1938 from the union of Manitoba College, founded in 1871, and Wesley College, founded in 1888. Originally affiliated with the University of Manitoba, United College received its charter in 1967 and became the University of Winnipeg.

Campus

 

The campus of The University of Winnipeg is made up of 23 buildings spreading over several full blocks of Downtown Winnipeg, located directly on Portage Avenue. Over the past decade, the campus has undergone over 10 new building construction or major renovation projects. Through its revitalization, the University has become an engine for downtown renewal and improvement.

The Rice Centre is the home of the university's administration and student services.

The Buhler Centre was constructed to house the Faculty of Business and Economics, as well as PACE (Professional, Applied and Continuing Education), a division of the University of Winnipeg. The doors to the Buhler Centre opened September 2010. Designed by PSA+DPA+DIN collective a collaborative effort between Peter Sampson Architecture Studio inc, David Penner Architect, and DIN Projects. The Buhler Centre also houses the Plug In Institute of Contemporary Art and Stella's Cafe on the main floor.

McFeetors Hall: Great-West Life Student Residence is a student dormitory. It was partially funded by Raymond L. McFeetors, Chairman of The Great West Life Assurance Company who donated $2.67 Million for a dormitory to be built on newly acquired property west of the campus. The money came from his personal resources and from Great West Life.

The Asper Centre for Theatre and Film provides facilities for theatre and media studies.

The Axworthy Health & RecPlex opened in 2014.  It offers a range of sport and recreation facilities.

Leatherdale Hall is a shared multi-use building

Downtown Commons which is located on Colony Street is a 14-storey apartment complex that offers accommodation for students and others.

Wesley Hall is a stone-clad brick structure built in 1894–95 and is on the Registry of Historic Places of Canada. It is located on 515 Portage Ave. near Portage Place Mall.
The Institute for stained glass in Canada has documented the stained glass at the University of Winnipeg. Specifically at the convocation hall.

Campus development

Campus development, by the University of Winnipeg, is headed by The University of Winnipeg Renewal Corporation (UWCRC), "a not-for-profit charitable corporation, spearheads and manages campus development." The UWCRC is a not-for-profit subsidiary of the University of Winnipeg and works to achieve environmental, social, economic and cultural sustainability. Their mandate is to "apply [the UWCRC's] values, skills, competencies, and experience to non-University specific economic development activities. [UWCRC] is mandated to develop wholly owned or joint-venture real estate developments and to provide development, project management and property management services to other post-secondary institutions, non-profit organizations and First Nations clients."

The university president sits as the chair of the corporation and participates in its business partnerships.

The structure of the UWCRC is unique in Canada as it allows the corporation to avoid being governed by the strictures of university governance. The corporation serves as "a primary engine for the redevelopment of Winnipeg's downtown", a task traditionally undertaken by government and the private sector, and not educational institutions.

Recent initiatives include the newly renovated Asper Centre for Theater and Film, Richardson College for the Environment and Science Complex, The Axworthy Health and RecPlex, McFeetors Hall (a new student residence) and the UWSA Daycare. A new mixed use 14-story apartment complex for students and the community began construction in 2015.

The financial statements of the corporation are not publicly available under public disclosure legislation. The corporate draws its operating funds entirely from the university budget.

Academic
The University of Winnipeg is a provincially and privately funded post-secondary institution with undergraduate and a growing number of graduate programs including Canada's only master's degree in development practice with a focus on Indigenous development, as well as a professional, applied and continuing education and a high school division.

Students and faculty
Students at the university are represented by the University of Winnipeg Students' Association. CKUW is the student radio station based at the University of Winnipeg. The Uniter is the campus newspaper. The Student Services staff are represented by AESES.

Faculties
 Faculty of Arts (34% of undergraduate students) offers Honours degree programs in Classics (Greek and Roman Studies), Conflict Resolution Studies, Criminal Justice, Developmental Studies, Disability Studies, English, French Studies, German Studies, History, History of Art, Human Rights, Indigenous Studies, Interdisciplinary Linguistics, International Development Studies, Mennonite Studies, Philosophy, Political Science, Psychology, Religion & Culture, Rhetoric, Writing and Communications, Sociology, Spanish Studies, Theatre & Film, Urban and Inner-City Studies, Women's & Gender Studies.
 Faculty of Business and Economics (14% of undergraduate students) offers undergraduate programs in Business & Administration, Economics, Economics and Finance. It also offers a joint program with Red River College.
 Faculty of Education (17% of undergraduate students)
 Gupta Faculty of Kinesiology and Applied Health (6% of undergraduate students) offers programs in Kinesiology, Physical and Health Education, Athletic Therapy.
 Faculty of Science (19% of undergraduate students) offers programs in Applied Computer Science, Bioanthropology, Biochemistry, Biology, Chemistry, Environmental Studies and Sciences, Geography, Mathematics, Neuroscience, Physics, Psychiatric Nursing, Statistics.
 Faculty of Graduate Studies offers a growing number of graduate programs. These include Masters of Arts programs in Applied Economics, Cultural Studies, Indigenous Governance, Environmental and Social Change, and Criminal Justice (as of Fall 2018), Master of Science programs in Applied Computer Science and Society, and Bioscience, Technology and Public Policy; Professional Programs in Indigenous Development, and Technology, Innovation and Operations.  It also offers several joint programs with the University of Manitoba. These include Masters programs in History, Public Administration, Religious Studies and in Peace and Conflict Studies There are several Postgraduate certificates: Higher Education Teaching Certificate and the Postgraduate Professional Skills Certificate
 United Centre for Theological Studies offers a variety of courses in theology. The Masters in Sacred Theology and Master of Arts Spiritual Disciplines & Ministry Practices are under review.

Colleges
There are three interdisciplinary colleges located on the campus:
 Global College is an interdisciplinary centre designed to bring together students, faculty and international visitors in dialogue about global citizenship. It hosts a BA in Human Rights and MAs in Indigenous Development and Peace & Conflict Studies.
 Menno Simons College is a centre for International Development Studies and Conflict Resolution Studies. It is located on the UofW campus and is a program of Canadian Mennonite University in affiliation with the University of Winnipeg.
 Richardson College for the Environment is a modern science research facility conducting research in biology, chemistry, environmental studies, Indigenous science and the social sciences.  It is one of the most energy efficient educational buildings in North America.

Research
The university has a growing research profile. Research grant income rose from $6M in 2015-16 to $12M in 2019-20.  It has established a number of research centres including the Centre for Access to Information and Justice (CAIJ), the Centre for Forest Interdisciplinary Research (C-FIR), the Centre for Research in Cultural Studies (CRiCS), and the Centre for Research in Young People's Texts and Cultures (CRYTC).

It has Canada Research Chairs in Fundamental Symmetries in Subatomic Physics, Quantum Materials Discovery, Culture and Public Memory, Human-Environment Interactions, Health & Culture, Indigenous People, History and Archives, Environmental Influences on Water Quality, and in Indigenous Arts, Collaboration and Digital Media.

Reputation

In Maclean's 2023 rankings, the university was ranked 13th out of 19 primarily undergraduate universities.

Indigenous UWinnipeg 
The University of Winnipeg offers several programs and services to Aboriginal people. It is the first university to mandate that all students take an Indigenous course requirement as part of their degree. The course was added by the University of Winnipeg in support and compliance with the recommendations by the Truth and Reconciliation Commission of Canada.

The University of Winnipeg offers a Bachelor of Arts in Indigenous Studies with a master's degree in Indigenous Governance. The University of Winnipeg provides special first-year bridging programs for Aboriginal students. Academic counsellors, tutors, and Aboriginal Elders are present on campus to provide academic and social supports, as offered by The Aboriginal Student Services Center (ASSC) on campus.

Through its Wii Chiiwaaknak Learning Centre, Eco-Kids Program and Eco-U Summer Camp services, the University of Winnipeg actively partners with Aboriginal communities. The University of Winnipeg is now offering the only master's degree in Development Practice with a focus on Indigenous Development in the world, joining a network of 22 prestigious universities globally with support from the MacArthur Foundation.

In 2012, the university named broadcaster Wab Kinew as its first Director of Aboriginal Inclusion, a position designed to oversee the expansion of culturally inclusive outreach efforts and program development in First Nations education.

The Collegiate

The Collegiate at The University of Winnipeg is an on-site high school that offers Grades 9, 10, 11, and 12 programs. It is an independent school and a division of The University of Winnipeg. It offers an admission process intended to accelerate admission into first year university for Collegiate Students. As of 2018, there are 445 students at The Collegiate.

The Collegiate was created within Wesley College in 1873. At the time it was the only secondary school in Manitoba.

Athletics

The university is represented in U Sports by the Winnipeg Wesmen in volleyball, basketball, soccer, wrestling, as well as baseball. The U of W built a new field house (" The RecPlex"), named after Lloyd Axworthy, adjacent to the Duckworth Centre that provides indoor soccer services and smoothies.

The Great Rock Climb
The University of Winnipeg has held their annual UWinnipeg Duckworth Great Rock Climb for over 67 years. The rock climb is traditionally held at the beginning of classes each year, on the front lawn of Portage Commons. The competition involves teams of three racing from Wesley Hall to the granite boulder monument on campus. The team to run and climb the rock the fastest wins. The fastest record was made at 9.4 seconds in 1979.

Library, Museum, Archives, and Art Gallery
The University of Winnipeg Library supports the teaching and research needs of the university community through consultation services, research materials access, and spaces for study. In addition to administration of the Library, The Dean of the Library manages a portfolio that includes the copyright office, archives, art gallery, anthropology museum, and WinnSpace, the university's institutional repository. The library facility occupies the 4th and 5th floors of Centennial Hall, which was featured on the March 1973 cover of Progressive Architecture.

The Anthropology Museum holds collections in ethnology, archaeology, primatology and hominid osteology which support the research, teaching, and public service functions of the Anthropology Department.

The University of Winnipeg Archives preserves and provides access to the records of the University of Winnipeg, as well as aspects of Manitoba history relevant to research at the University of Winnipeg, including social justice and human rights.

Gallery 1C03 is the campus art gallery, located in Centennial Hall. The mission of the gallery is to, "engage diverse communities through the development and presentation of contemporary and historical art exhibitions and related programming initiatives." The gallery shows Manitoban, Canadian as well as international artists. The gallery also works to develop, preserve and present the university's art collection.

People

Chancellors
 Paul Thorlakson (1969-1978)
 Roderick O.A. Hunter (1978-1984)
 W. John A. Bulman (1984-1996)
 Carol Shields (1996-2000)
 H. Sanford Riley (2000-2009)
 Bob Silver (2009-2020)
 Barb Gamey (2020-present)

Presidents
 Wilfred Lockhart (1967–1971)
 Henry Duckworth (1971–1981)
 Robin Farquhar (1981–1989)
 Marsha Hanen (1989–1999)
 Constance Rooke (1999–2003)
 Patrick Deane (2003–2004; Interim President)
 Lloyd Axworthy (2004–2014)
 Annette Trimbee (2014–2020)
 James Currie (2020-2022; Interim President)
 Todd Mondor (2022-present)

Notable faculty

 Tim Ball. geographer and public speaker
 Bill Blaikie, former politician, leader of the New Democratic Party and adjunct professor of Theology and Politics
 Cal Botterill, sports psychologist
 Jennifer S.H. Brown, Tier 1 Canada Research Chair for Aboriginal Peoples in an Urban and Regional Context and Fellow of the Royal Society of Canada
 Nora Decter, novelist
 Mark Golden, historian
 Trudy Govier, philosopher
 Catherine Hunter, poet, novelist and professor of creative writing
 Wab Kinew, broadcaster and politician
 Sandra Kirby, sociologist
 Royden Loewen, scholar in the field of Mennonite history
 Arthur R. M. Lower, historian
 Ian MacPherson, historian
 Diane McGifford, historian and politician
 Hope McIntyre, playwright
 Marilou McPhedran, lawyer
 Vesna Milosevic-Zdjelar, astrophysicist, science educator
 Ortrud Oellermann, mathematician 
 Lara Rae, an instructor in the Department of Women’s and Gender Studies
 Al Reimer, literary critic
 Mavis Reimer, Canada Research Chair in Young People’s Texts and Cultures, 2005-2015
 Michael Weinrath, founding chair (2004 to 2012) of Criminal Justice and Interdisciplinary Criminology, inaugural director (2013) of the Justice Research Institute
 Albert Welter, scholar of Buddhism
 Jenny Heijun Wills, creative writer
 Robert J. Young, historian

Notable alumni

 Ida Albo – businessperson
 Lloyd Axworthy – politician and former UW President, Nobel prize nominee
 Tom Axworthy – Canadian Civil Servant
 Omar Zakhilwal – Afghan Finance Minister as well as the Chief Economic Advisor to the President of Afghanistan
 David Bergen – Award-winning author (BEd 1985)
 Bill Blaikie – New Democratic Member of Parliament and provincial cabinet minister
 Margaret Bloodworth – National Security Advisor (BA 1970)
 Alan Cross - radio personality
 Ruby Dhalla – Liberal Member of Parliament
 Aganetha Dyck – artist
 Jaimie Isaac - artist and curator
 Chantal Kreviazuk – singer/songwriter
 Margaret Laurence – Canadian novelist and short-story writer
 Guy Maddin – film director
 Don Newman – Award-winning journalist
 John Paskievich – film director and photographer
 Howard Pawley – former Premier of Manitoba
 Fred Penner – children's entertainer
 Madison Thomas – filmmaker
 Susan Thompson – former mayor of Winnipeg
 Brad Roberts – pop singer, Crash Test Dummies
 Bill Richardson – CBC radio host
 Erfan Nasajpour – professional basketball player
 Andrea Slobodian – reporter
 Sonia Sui – a model and actress in Taiwan
 Lois Wilson – first female Moderator of the United Church of Canada
 Vic Toews – Former Conservative MP and held different positions in Cabinet, Manitoba Judge
 Dave Weasel - Comedian
 Colleen Dell - Public sociologist

University history
 A. Gerald Bedford 'The University of Winnipeg: A History of the Founding Colleges' (Toronto: University of Toronto Press, 1976)
 Friesen, Gerald. "Principal J. H. Riddell: The Sane and Safe Leader of Wesley College." In Prairie Spirit: Perspectives on the Heritage of the United Church of Canada in the West, edited by Dennis L. Butcher, et al. Winnipeg: University of Manitoba Press, 1985.

See also

 List of universities in the Canadian Prairies
 Higher education in Manitoba
 U Sports
 Canadian government scientific research organizations
 Canadian university scientific research organizations
 Canadian industrial research and development organizations
 Education in Canada

References

External links

 
 The University of Winnipeg Students' Association
 University of Winnipeg's Division of Continuing Education
 The Directory of Canadian Universities – University of Winnipeg

 
Universities and colleges in Winnipeg